Çöl Kartalı is a 1972 Turkish historical romance film, directed by Halit Refiğ and starring Cüneyt Arkın, Bahar Erdeniz, Süleyman Turan.

Plot 
The film is about the love of two Ottoman officers, who are close friends, for the same woman. Murat and Faruk, who grew up together, are among the successful officers of the Ottoman Empire. Unaware of each other, they fall in love with Kamil Pasha's daughter, Leyla. While Murat and Leyla have been dreaming of marriage for a long time, Faruk is looking for a way to open up to Leyla. When Murat and Faruk graduate from military school, they are assigned to Yemen by Kamil Pasha. One day, when they are in conflict with the desert bandits, Murat is injured and lost in the desert. Faruk escapes and returns to Istanbul and asks Kamil Pasha for Leyla. Leyla accepts this marriage to forget her pain. Meanwhile, Murat is rescued by a slave who finds himself in the desert. When his wounds heal, he returns to Istanbul. The marriage of Leyla and Faruk will cause her to return to the deserts.

Cast 
 Cüneyt Arkın
 Bahar Erdeniz
 Süleyman Turan
 Hayati Hamzaoğlu
 Atıf Kaptan
 Kazım Kartal
 Cemil Can Biçakcı
 Yusuf Sezer
 Murat Tok
 Tuba Şarman
 Mehmet Şahiner
 Meral Zeren

References

External links 

1972 films
1970s historical adventure films
Turkish romance films
Turkish historical adventure films
Films directed by Halit Refiğ
1970s historical romance films
1970s action adventure films
Films set in the Ottoman Empire
Films set in Turkey
Films set in Egypt
Turkish films about revenge
Romantic action films
Historical action films
Turkish action adventure films
Turkish swashbuckler films